At least three sailing ships have been named Campbell Macquarie:
 , 235 or 248 tons (bm), built at Calcutta, India. Wrecked near Macquarie Island in 1812.
 Campbell Macquarie, 133 ton (bm) square-rigged ship built in 1813 by Samuel Gunn at Hobart Town.
 Campbell Macquarie, a vessel that the former master of the first vessel above sailed to Sydney with merchandise from Bengal, arriving 30 June 1814. She then left on 27 July for Fiji.

Ship names